Tashir is a town and urban municipal community located in Lori Province at the north of Armenia, near the border with Georgia. It is located 42 km north of the provincial centre Vanadzor and 154 north of the capital Yerevan. As per the 2016 official estimate, the population of Tashir is around 7,500.

Etymology
Tashir was founded in 1844 as Vorontsovka, named after the Russian prince and field-marshal Mikhail Semyonovich Vorontsov who was leader in the Caucasian War from 1844 to 1853. In 1935, the town was renamed Kalinino by the Soviets, in honor of the Bolshevik revolutionary Mikhail Kalinin. With the independence of Armenia in 1991, the town was renamed Tashir after the historic Armenian region of Tashir, a canton within the Gugark province; the 13th province of the historic Greater Armenia.

The name of Tashir – known as Tashiri in neighboring Georgia – is known since classical antiquity, referring to the plateau between the Debed and Pambak rivers. It was first mentioned by the Armenian historian Movses Khorenatsi in his 5th-century monumental work History of Armenia, as one of the cantons of the lords of Gugark.

History
Historically, the area of modern-day Tashir was included in the Tashir canton of the historic Gugark province, the 13th province of Greater Armenia. During the reign of the Arsacid dynasty (52–428 AD) and later under Sasanid Persia (428–651), the area of Artik was ruled by the Kamsarakan Armenian noble family. With the Arab invasion of Armenia in 654, the region was granted to the Bagratid dynasty, who founded the Bagratid Kingdom of Armenia later in 885. 

Between 979 and 1118, the region of Tashir became part of the Kingdom of Tashir-Dzoraget under the rule the Kiurikian dynasty. Between 1201 and 1360, it was part of Zakarid Armenia under the protectorate of the Kingdom of Georgia. The region became a prominent centre of the Armenian culture and scholars under the rule of the Zakarid princes of Armenia. However, after the Mongols captured Ani in 1236, Zakarid Armenia turned into a Mongol protectorate as part of the Ilkhanate. After the fall of the Ilkhanate in the mid-14th century, the Zakarid princes controlled over Tashir until 1360 when they fell to the invading Turkic tribes.

After suffering from the invasion of Aq Qoyunlu, Kara Koyunlu, Ottomans and Persians from the 14th to 18th centuries, most of the territories in northern Armenia were annexed from Qajar Persia in favour of the Russian Empire In 1801. The region of Tashir became officially part of the Russian Empire at the Treaty of Gulistan signed on 24 October 1813 between Imperial Russia and Qajar Persia.

In the Russian Empire, Tashir was founded in 1844 as Vorontsovka by Russian migrants from Saratov. The newly-established settlement was named after the Viceroy of the Caucasus Mikhail Semyonovich Vorontsov. In 1846, it was included in the Borchaly uezd of the Tiflis Governorate.

In 1935, during the Soviet rule, the settlement was renamed Kalinino after the Russian Bolshevik revolutionary leader Mikhail Kalinin and was called. In 1961, Kalinino was granted the statues of an urban-type settlement to become the centre of Kalinino raion. In 1983, it was granted with the status of a town.

With the independence of Armenia in 1991, the town was renamed Tashir after the historic Tashir canton of Gugark, and was eventually included within the Lori Province formed as per the 1995 administrative reforms of independent Armenia.

Geography

Situated at the northern part of Lori plain, Tashir is located on the shores of Tashir river, at an elevation of 1500 meters above sea level. The town is surrounded with black prairies, alpine meadows and many marshes. The town is dominated by the Javakhk range of the Lesser Caucasus from the west. Mount Achkasar which is the highest point of the range with a height of 3,196 meters, is located 25 km west of Tashir.

The town is characterized with a subtropical climate, with an average temperature of −5 in January, and 19 in July. The annual precipitation level is 420 mm.

Demographics

Currently, the majority of the population in Tashir are ethnic Armenians who belong to the Armenian Apostolic Church, regulated by the Diocese of Gougark, based in Vanadzor. The town's Surp Sarkis Armenian Apostolic church was built between 1995 and 2000 through donations from businessman Samvel Karapetyan and his brother Karen. There is also a tiny community of followers of the Armenian Catholic Church.

The healthcare is served through the Tashir Medical Center.

Culture
The area of modern-day Tashir was probably settled during the early Bronze Age. A cyclopean fortress, as well as an ancient cemetery dating back to the 3rd and 2nd millennium BC respectively are found near the town. The remains of a 10th-century church are also visible in the town.
 
Nowadays, Tashir is home to a cultural center, 3 public libraries, as well as a music school.

Transportation
Tashir is located on the M-3 Motorway that connects on Yerevan with Tbilisi. The town is also connected with eastern and western Armenia through the H-31 Road.

Economy
The majority of the residents of Tashir are involved in industry, mainly the production of canned food and dairy. The town is home to a Swiss cheese factory that produces the cheeses Lori and Chanakh. It was one of the largest plants for dairy products in the Soviet Union.

However, the majority of the inhabitants are employed in agriculture. 32% of the lands are privatized, 71% of which are arable lands and 29% of which are pastures. Half of the state importance lands is 1660 ha. The lands are also used as arable farms and meadows, which cover 951 and 581 hectares, respectively. Other agricultural products and activities include grain, melons and gourds, potatoes and fruits, cattle-breeding, pig-breeding, poultry farming and bee-keeping.

Currently, the town is mainly suffering from its outdated network of regional roads, the sewage system and the water supply network.

Education
Tashir has 3 public education schools as well as many kindergartens. In 2015, the number of the students in the town reached up to 1186.

However, among the main problems of the community are the outdated school buildings and complexes.

Sport
There are two sport schools in the town mainly dedicated to individual sports including wrestling, weightlifting, martial arts and chess. There is also a regular-sized football training filed in the town.

As of 2015, the number of children attending the sport schools is around 120 children.

Notable people
 Amar Suloev, mixed martial artist
 Movlud Suleymanli, Azerbaijani screenwriter and dramatist
 Samvel Karapetyan, Armenian-born Russian businessman and owner of Tashir Group
 Samir Aliyev, retired Azerbaijani footballer

See also
 Tashir (historical region)
 Kingdom of Tashir-Dzoraget

References

Populated places in Lori Province
Tiflis Governorate